Big Sandy Dam is a dam in Sweetwater County, Wyoming, about ten miles north of Farson.

The earthen dam impounds the Big Sandy River and stands 85 feet high.  It was built from 1941 to 1952 by the United States Bureau of Reclamation as part of its Eden Project for irrigation storage.  No hydroelectric power is generated here.  The dam is operated by the local Eden Valley Irrigation and Drainage District.

The lake allows for boating, camping and fishing recreation with primitive facilities.

References 

Dams in Wyoming
Dams in the Green River (Colorado River tributary) basin
Buildings and structures in Sweetwater County, Wyoming
Earth-filled dams
United States Bureau of Reclamation dams
Dams completed in 1952
Reservoirs in Wyoming
Landforms of Sweetwater County, Wyoming
1952 establishments in Wyoming